is a Japanese daily sports newspaper founded in 1960.

See also 
 Tokyo Sports Film Award
 Tokyo Sports Puroresu Awards

References

External links 
 http://www.tokyo-sports.co.jp Official website

1960 establishments in Japan
Daily newspapers published in Japan
Publications established in 1960
Sports newspapers published in Japan
Newspapers published in Tokyo
Japanese-language newspapers